Montrose station was a station on the Metro-North Railroad's Hudson Line, serving the hamlet of Montrose, New York. It closed in 1996 when it and the next station southbound, Crugers, were replaced by the Cortlandt station between them.

History 
The station, isolated and lightly used, and Crugers station were replaced as part of the last stage of expanding the Hudson Line to six-car high-level platforms. Together, they recorded 332 riders in the morning peak in 1991. While they could be converted to high-level platforms, there was no space to lengthen the platforms or provide expanded parking because the station was surrounded by protected wetlands as well as a bridge abutment adjacent to the station prohibiting such expansion. The station had 102 parking spaces for commuter usage. The station closed on June 30, 1996.

References

External links
Former Montrose Station images (WorldNYCSubway.org)
Former Montrose Metro-North Station (Road and Rail Pictures)

Metro-North Railroad stations in New York (state)
Former New York Central Railroad stations
Railway stations in Westchester County, New York
Railway stations closed in 1996
1996 disestablishments in New York (state)